Take off commonly refers to:
Takeoff, the aircraft flight phase in which a vehicle goes from the ground to flying in the air
Parody, a creative work designed to imitate, comment on, and/or make fun of its subject by means of satiric or ironic imitation

Take off, Take Off or Takeoff may also refer to:

Films
Takeoff (film), a 1979 Soviet drama film
Take Off (2009 film), a South Korean film
Take Off (2017 film), a Malayalam film directed by Mahesh Narayanan

Music

Albums and EPs
 Take Off, a 2001 album by Thee Shams
 Take Off (Folks EP), 2013
 Take Off (WayV EP), 2019
Take Off, a 2018 EP by GreatGuys

Songs
 "Take Off" (2PM song), 2011
 "Take Off" (Bob and Doug McKenzie song), 1981
 "Take Off" (Chipmunk song), 2011
 "Take Off" (Hooligan Hefs, Scndl and Sunset Bros song), 2021
 "Take-off" (Vivid song), 2010
 "Take Off" (Young Dro song), 2009

Other music
 Takeoff (rapper) (1994–2022), American rapper

Other uses
 Take Off (painting), a 1943 painting by Laura Knight
 Take Off with Bradley & Holly, 2019 BBC TV Gameshow
 Take Off! (game), a 1988 board game
 Takeoff!, a 1980 collection of humorous material by Randall Garrett

See also
Material take off
Taking Off (disambiguation)
Take It Off (disambiguation)